Presidential elections were held in Syria on 10 February 1985. There was only one candidate, Hafez al-Assad, with voters asked to approve or reject his candidacy. A reported 99.99% of voters voted in favour, with a turnout of 94.5%.

Results

References

Syria
1985 in Syria
Presidential elections in Syria
Single-candidate elections